Calcium aluminoferrite is a dark brown crystalline phase commonly found in cements. In the cement industry it is termed tetra-calcium aluminoferrite or ferrite. In cement chemist notation (CCN), it is abbreviated as  meaning  in the oxide notation. It also exists in nature as the rare mineral brownmillerite.

Properties of the pure phase
In the absence of elements other than calcium, aluminium, iron and oxygen, calcium aluminoferrite forms a solid solution series of formula  for all values of x in the range 0–0.7.
Compositions with x > 0.7 do not exist at ordinary pressures (see dicalcium aluminate). The crystal is orthorhombic, and is normally lath-like. Its density varies from 4026 kg·m−3 (x = 0) to 3614 kg⋅m−3 (x = 0.7). All compositions melt incongruently in the range 1400−1450 °C. They are ferromagnetic, progressively more so as iron content increases. These phases are easily prepared from the oxides.

Phases in Portland cement clinker
In Portland cement clinker, calcium aluminoferrite occurs as an "interstitial phase", crystallizing from the melt as the reaction end-product of the flux components ( and ) added in the raw materials to lower the high melting point of the oxide mix CaO-. Its presence in clinker is solely due to the need to obtain liquid at the peak kiln processing temperature (1400−1450 °C), facilitating the formation of the desired silicate phases. Apart from this benefit, its effects on cement properties are little more than those of a diluent. Its forms an impure solid solution that deviates markedly in composition from the simple chemical formula. The calcium aluminoferrite phase acts as a repository for many of the minor elements in the clinker. Most of the transition metals in the cement are found in the ferrite phase, notably titanium, manganese and zinc. There is also a substantial amount of magnesium and silicon, and because of this, oxides other than CaO,  and  often make up 15% of the mass of the calcium aluminoferrite. This substitution reduces its melting point to around 1350 °C.

The typical chemical composition of calcium aluminoferrite  for three different clinker bulk  contents is given in the next table.,  The calcium aluminoferrite mean composition is clearly dominated by CaO (43.7 wt. %),  (19.3 wt %), and  (25.4 wt. %). The mean contents in  (4.2 wt. %) and other oxides are marginal. 

Behavior in cements
Calcium aluminoferrite has little effect upon the physical properties of cement. On hydration it forms hydrogarnet  and hydrated iron oxide gel. In principle, this is a fast and energetic exothermic reaction, but precipitation of an insoluble layer of hydrated iron oxide upon the calcium aluminoferrite crystal surface forms a barrier to further reaction. In the case of Portland cement, subsequent slow reaction with dissolved sulfate forms an AFm phase, which has negligible strength-giving properties. In the case of calcium aluminate cements (CAC), the situation is less clear-cut, but there is little contribution to early strength. Calcium aluminoferrite is also present in calcium sulfoaluminate (CSA) cements, and again contributes no strength.

See also
The three other main mineral phases of Portland cement clinker are: 
 Alite, or 
 Belite, or 
 Tricalcium aluminate, or

References

Further reading

 
 

Cement
Calcium compounds
Aluminium compounds
Iron compounds
Ferrites
Oxide minerals